Douglas Bennett (19 November 1886 – 14 August 1982) was a South African cricketer. He played in seven first-class matches from 1912/13 to 1923/24.

References

External links
 

1886 births
1982 deaths
South African cricketers
Border cricketers
Eastern Province cricketers